Tulia Angela Medina Alcalde (born March 18, 1983 in Cali, Valle del Cauca) is a female weightlifter from Colombia. She won a gold medal at the 2007 Pan American Games for her native South American country. Medina twice represented Colombia at the Summer Olympics: in 2004 and 2008.

References
 sports-reference

1983 births
Living people
Sportspeople from Cali
Olympic weightlifters of Colombia
Weightlifters at the 2004 Summer Olympics
Weightlifters at the 2008 Summer Olympics
Weightlifters at the 2003 Pan American Games
Weightlifters at the 2007 Pan American Games
Colombian female weightlifters
Pan American Games gold medalists for Colombia
Female powerlifters
Pan American Games medalists in weightlifting
Central American and Caribbean Games gold medalists for Colombia
Competitors at the 2006 Central American and Caribbean Games
Central American and Caribbean Games medalists in weightlifting
Medalists at the 2007 Pan American Games
21st-century Colombian women